Chaykino is a rural locality (a settlement) in Pogarsky District, Bryansk Oblast, Russia. The population was 479 as of 2010. There are 3 streets.

Geography 
Chaykino is located 4 km southwest of Pogar (the district's administrative centre) by road. Graborovka is the nearest rural locality.

References 

Rural localities in Brasovsky District